Kuhsar (also Romanized as Kūhsār, Koohsar, and Kūhsar; also known as Gūsār) is a village in Arabkhaneh Rural District, Shusef District, Nehbandan County, South Khorasan Province, Iran. At the 2006 census, its population was 41, in 11 families.

References 

Populated places in Nehbandan County